was the pen name of Japanese artist, illustrator, writer, and designer . His illustrations of "large-headed" (nitōshin) baby-faced girls, first drawn for Japanese magazines in the mid-1950s, are credited with pioneering the contemporary culture and aesthetic of kawaii ( "lovable" or "cute"). He is further noted for his contributions to the Japanese gay men's magazine Barazoku, the first commercially circulated gay magazine in Japan.

Biography

Naito was born in Okazaki, Aichi. He pursued illustration after discovering the art of Jun'ichi Nakahara as a child, and began correspondence with the artist after graduating high school. Nakahara invited Naito to study under him as an assistant, prompting Naito to relocate from Okazaki to Tokyo at age 19. In 1954, Nakahara became a contributor to Junior Soleil, a girls' magazine edited by Nakahara, where he produced illustrations and wrote a fashion column titled "Fairy Memo". He drew under the pen name "Rune", as a reference to filmmaker René Clément.

Naito's "Rune Girl" illustrations, first published in Junior Soleil, were distinguished by their large heads (nitōshin) and baby-faced features. These illustrations are credited with pioneering the concept of kawaii, expanding the meaning of the word beyond its use as synonymous with "childish" to define what would become a culture and aesthetic. Children, fruit, and animals were common motifs in his art; after seeing pandas at the London Zoo in 1971, Naito created "Rune Panda", who would become one of his most ubiquitous and popular characters.

Naito's first books, Konnichiwa Mademoiselle and Junior's Diary, were published in 1959 and 1960, respectively. He departed girls' magazines in the 1960s to illustrate for women's, fashion, and interior design magazines. From the 1960s to the 1980s, he produced his own line of commercial goods, including glassware, tableware, and stickers.

In the 1970s and 1980s, Naito contributed gay erotic illustrations to Barazoku, the first commercially circulated gay men's magazine in Japan; the cover to the first issue of the magazine was designed by Naito's long-time partner Ryu Fujita. Naito's works were not overtly pornographic, instead depicting what he described as "cheerfulness and sexiness" that did not make men "look degraded." Naito was publicly closeted for the majority of his life, and did not come out as gay until his 2005 memoir Subete o Nakushite (After Losing Everything). Though Naito's erotic illustrations were historically excluded from retrospectives of his work, recent exhibitions (such as 2019's "Roots of Kawaii") have begun to include them.

Beginning in the 1980s, Naito began to create works that were a departure from his early kawaii aesthetic, such as oil paintings and freehand sketches influenced by Henri Rousseau. On October 24, 2007, Naito died of acute heart failure in his home in Izu, Shizuoka at the age of 74. While Naito was widely recognized in Japan in his lifetime, his works have continued to grow in popularity since his death. In 2011,  founder Sebastian Masuda launched "Rune Boutique", an exhibition and pop-up shop featuring Naito's works, in Los Angeles. In 2018, Peach Aviation launched a plane featuring artwork of Rune Girl.

Exhibitions

2001: Rune Naito Doll Museum, Shuzenji, Shizuoka
2002: Yayoi Kusama Museum, Tokyo
2005: Yayoi Kusama Museum, Tokyo
2018: Daimaru Umeda,  Umeda, Osaka
2018: , Okazaki, Aichi
2019: Okazaki Mindscape Museum, Okazaki, Aichi – "Roots of Kawaii"

Further reading
 Naito, Rune. After My Downfall (Subete o Nakushite). Shogakukan (2005). 
 Naito, Rune. Rune Naito Artbox: The Roots of Kawaii. Kodansha (2015). 
 "Rune Naito: Roots of Kawaii", published by Okazaki Public Services

References

External links
 Official website 

1932 births
2007 deaths
20th-century Japanese artists
Japanese gay artists
Japanese erotic artists
People from Okazaki, Aichi
Artists from Aichi Prefecture
20th-century Japanese LGBT people